Taunton Deane services is a double sided motorway service station on the M5 motorway near Taunton, England. It is owned by Roadchef.

Location
The services are located between junctions 25 and 26 of the M5 motorway in Somerset. There are two sites, one for each direction connected by a walk bridge. After a spate of suicides by hanging, the bridge had anti-suicide bars installed.

Facilities
The services opened in 1976, and employ around 130 people. In 2012, they were awarded RoadChef's Heroes of the Year Awards.

A Costa Coffee drive thru opened on the southbound services in 2019. A corresponding northbound drive thru opened the following year.

Cleanliness
The services were notorious in the early 2000s for its poor cleanliness rating. In general, the southbound side receives better ratings than the northbound side. In 2012, the Food Standards Agency gave both sides a rating of 5, showing improvement.

External links 
Taunton Deane Services - Motorway Services Online

References 

M5 motorway service stations
RoadChef motorway service stations
Transport in Somerset
Buildings and structures in Taunton Deane